Robert Moberly may refer to:
 Robert Moberly (bishop) (1884–1978), British Anglican bishop
 Robert Moberly (priest) (1845–1903), English theologian
 Robert B. Moberly, dean and professor of law